Miguel Gaspar (19 September 1929 – 22 July 2012) played and managed in the Mexican League, the highest level of professional baseball in Mexico.

A catcher, he also played in United States-based minor leagues from 1950 to 1958. All told, he played professionally from 1950 to 1969 and he managed in 1959, from 1975 to 1977, in 1979, from 1985 to 1986, in 1988 and in 1993. He was elected to the Mexican Professional Baseball Hall of Fame in 1994.

His nickname was Pilo. He was born in Empalme, Sonora, México.

References

Mexican Baseball Hall of Fame inductees
Minor league baseball players
Minor league baseball managers
1929 births
2012 deaths
Baseball players from Sonora
People from Empalme, Sonora